How to Get Over a Breakup is a 2018 Peruvian comedy film directed by Bruno Ascenzo and Joanna Lombardi and written by Samuel Stewart Hunter and María José Osorio.

Plot 
The film is about a copywriter, Maria Fe (Gisela Ponce de León), who is suddenly dumped. In a way of getting over the breakup, she starts a blog about how to do it.

Cast 
 Gisela Ponce de León as María Fé
 Karina Jordán as Natalia
 Jely Reátegui as Carolina
 Christopher von Uckermann as Santiago
 Andrés Salas as Matías
 Carlos Carlín as Ramiro
 Mario Saldaña as Diego
 Anai Padilla as Fio
 Nicolás Galindo as Charly
 Guillermo Castañeda as Minimi
 Yaco Eskenazi as Andrés
 César Ritter as Lorenzo
 Rodrigo Palacios as Jaime

References

External links 
 
 

2018 films
2018 comedy films
Peruvian comedy films
Tondero Producciones films
Spanish-language Netflix original films
2010s Peruvian films
2010s Spanish-language films